The 2020–21 Biathlon World Cup – Stage 5 was the fifth event of the season and was held in Oberhof, Germany, from 8 to 10 January 2021.

Schedule of events 
The events took place at the following times.

Medal winners

Men

Women

Mixed

Achievements 

 Best individual performance for all time
Not include World Championships and Olympic Games

 , 10th place in Sprint
 , 11th place in Sprint
 , 24th place in Sprint
 , 33rd place in Sprint
 , 47th place in Pursuit
 , 56th place in Pursuit
 , 72nd place in Sprint
 , 75th place in Sprint
 , 77th place in Sprint
 , 92nd place in Sprint
 , 94th place in Sprint
 , 3rd place in Sprint
 , 6th place in Sprint
 , 45th place in Sprint
 , 46th place in Sprint
 , 87th place in Sprint

 First individual World Cup race

 , 24th place in Sprint
 , 33rd place in Sprint
 , 87th place in Sprint

References

Biathlon World Cup - Stage 5, 2020-21
2020–21 Biathlon World Cup
Biathlon competitions in Germany
Biathlon World Cup